Half Moon Lake  is a lake in Meeker County, in the U.S. state of Minnesota.

Half Moon Lake was named on account of its outline being shaped like a half moon.

See also
List of lakes in Minnesota

References

Lakes of Minnesota
Lakes of Meeker County, Minnesota